Vayavyastra is a celestial weapon (astra) in Hindu mythology. Named after and attributed to the wind god Vayu, the weapon is referenced in various Hindu texts, such as the Mahabharata and the Puranas.

References

Weapons in Hindu mythology